The 1998 Chamba massacre was the killing of thirty-five Hindus by Hizbul Mujahideen, in the Chamba district of Himachal Pradesh in India on 3 August 1998.

The Attacks
The Pakistan-trained Islamic terrorists massacred 35 Hindus, mostly labourers, and injured 11 in the Chamba district bordering Doda in Jammu on early hours of that day. The massacre took place in two separate incidents at Kalaban and Satrundi. Twenty-six people were killed and eight injured in the Kalaban area under Police Station Tissa of Chamba District. In another incident, at about 1:30 a.m. that morning, five people were killed and three injured in village Satrindi, District Chamba. News of the massacre became public when two of the injured at Kalaban—Dhian Singh and Beli Ram—with blood oozing from their wounds, trudged eight kilometers through the dense forests report the mayhem to the nearest Mansa police station. The massacre led to clashes between Muslim Gujjars and Hindu Gaddis .

The aftermath
Top Hizbul Mujahideen terrorists Billu Gujjar was arrested in Pathankot by Punjab Police a few days later in connection with this attack.

References

External links
Ethnic Cleansing Planned to The Last Detail

Massacres in 1998
Chamba district
1990s in Himachal Pradesh
Islamic terrorism in India
Kashmir conflict
Massacres in India
Violence against Hindus in India
Terrorist incidents in India in 1998
Crime in Himachal Pradesh
August 1998 events in Asia
Islamic terrorist incidents in 1998